Hocine Cherhabil (born 24 February 1953) is the Algerian Minister of Digitization and Statistics. He was appointed as minister on 9 September 2022.

Education 
Cherhabil holds a Diploma in Political Science (1975) from the University of Algiers, a Diploma in Human Resources Management Techniques (1993) from the International Institute of Public Administration, a Doctorate in Social Sciences (1982) from the École des hautes études des sciences sociales de Paris and a Doctorate in Political Science and International Relations (2009) from the University of Algiers.

References 

1953 births
Living people
21st-century Algerian politicians
Algerian politicians
Government ministers of Algeria
University of Algiers alumni